Cameron Charles Newton (born February 25, 1950) is a Canadian former professional ice hockey goaltender.

Early life 
Newton was born in Peterborough, Ontario. He played in the Ontario Hockey Association junior league with the Toronto Marlboros, helping them win the Memorial Cup.

Career 
Newton was drafted by the Pittsburgh Penguins in 1970 and played 16 games for the club over two seasons. Newton also played 102 games during his three years in the World Hockey Association for the Chicago Cougars, Denver Spurs, Ottawa Civics and Cleveland Crusaders.

External links

1950 births
Living people
Amarillo Wranglers players
Canadian ice hockey goaltenders
Chicago Cougars players
Cleveland Crusaders players
Denver Spurs (WHA) players
Erie Blades players
Hampton Gulls (SHL) players
Hershey Bears players
Ice hockey people from Ontario
Kitchener Rangers players
Pittsburgh Penguins players
Pittsburgh Penguins draft picks
Sportspeople from Peterborough, Ontario
Toronto Marlboros players